Robert Nunn (born June 10, 1965) is an American football coach who was most recently the defensive line coach at Appalachian State. He played linebacker at Oklahoma State.

Nunn joined the Green Bay Packers on February 8, 2005, as the defensive tackles coach, but was let go along with the majority of the defensive coaching staff after a disappointing 2008 season. Nunn was hired several weeks later by the Tampa Bay Buccaneers as one of two defensive line coaches.

On January 27, 2010, Robert Nunn was hired as the New York Giants defensive line coach. He was part of the staff that won Super Bowl XLVI over the New England Patriots.

Robert Nunn lived in Mahwah, New Jersey at the time of his Super Bowl Victory.

References

External links
 New York Giants bio

1965 births
Living people
Oklahoma State Cowboys football players
Northeastern State RiverHawks football coaches
Tennessee Volunteers football coaches
Miami Dolphins coaches
Washington Redskins coaches
Green Bay Packers coaches
Tampa Bay Buccaneers coaches
New York Giants coaches
Cleveland Browns coaches
New York Jets coaches